Zimna Woda (Polish/Russian/Ukrainian for "Cold Water") may refer to the following places in Poland or Ukraine:
Zimna Woda, Lviv Oblast (west Ukraine)
Zimna Woda, Lower Silesian Voivodeship (south-west Poland)
Zimna Woda, Pajęczno County in Łódź Voivodeship (central Poland)
Zimna Woda, Zgierz County in Łódź Voivodeship (central Poland)
Zimna Woda, Lublin Voivodeship (east Poland)
Zimna Woda, Subcarpathian Voivodeship (south-east Poland)
Zimna Woda, Masovian Voivodeship (east-central Poland)
Zimna Woda, Nidzica County in Warmian-Masurian Voivodeship (north Poland)
Zimna Woda, Szczytno County in Warmian-Masurian Voivodeship (north Poland)